In music, klang (also "clang") is a term sometimes used to translate the German Klang, a highly polysemic word. Technically, the term denotes any periodic sound, especially as opposed to simple periodic sounds (sine tones). In the German lay usage, it may mean "sound" or "tone" (as synonymous to Ton), "musical tone" (as opposed to noise), "note", or "timbre"; a chord of three notes is called a Dreiklang, etc.

Klang has been used among others by Hugo Riemann and by Heinrich Schenker. In translations of their writings, it has erroneously been rendered as "chord" and more specifically as "chord of nature". The idea of the chord of nature connects with earlier ideas that can be found especially in French music theory. Both Hugo Riemann and Heinrich Schenker implicitly or explicitly refer to the theory of the chord of nature (which they recognize as a triad, a Dreiklang), but both reject the theory as a foundation of music because it fails to explain the minor triad. The theory of the chord of nature goes back to the discovery and the description of the harmonic partials (harmonic overtones) in the 17th century.

Klang 
The word "klang" (or "clang") has often been used in English as a translation of the German Klang ("sound"), e.g. in the English translation of Riemann's Vereinfachte Harmonielehre. Among the few usages found in scholarly literature to denote the 'chord of nature', one may quote Ruth Solie, who speaks of "the major triad or Naturklang as found in the overtone series", or Benjamin Ayotte, who refers to an article by Oswald Jonas in 1937 which apparently makes use of the term.

The confusion by which the term has been used to denote a chord (instead of a complex sound) probably arises with Rameau's theory of Résonance. Rameau had misunderstood Joseph Sauveur's experiments, intended to demonstrate the existence of overtones, and believed that the harmonic partials arose from a resonance within the fundamental note, to which he gave the name corps sonore, often translated as Klang in German. As Henry Klumpenhouwer writes,

Klang, he adds,

Klang, therefore, should in most cases better be understood as "the fundamental sound", possibly "the sound of nature".

Riemann defines the Klang as "a compound sound":

He adds that

And Schenker, although he recognizes that "the Klang as it exists in Nature is a triad", nevertheless stresses that

And further:

Chord of nature 
According to Nicholas Cook, the theory of the chord of nature is a striking manifestation of the recurrent strive, "to understand music as an ultimately physical phenomenon".

The theory appears to first have developed in French theory, culminating in Catel's Traité d'harmonie of 1802. Catel writes:

This became a dogma of the Paris Conservatoire: all chords that can be found in the major or minor dominant 9th are "natural", all others are "artificial". The "chord of nature" is here considered dissonant. Some theorists (including Schenker or Maurice Emmanuel) considered that overtones higher than the fifth (or sixth) could not be heard and that no dissonance could ever be justified by the harmonic series.

Maurice Emmanuel wrote

This statement has been one source of Jacques Chailley's evolutionary theory, describing music history as the progressive understanding and usage of higher overtones.
The theory of the Chord of Nature was fashionable in the early 20th century. It figures prominently, for instance, in Schönberg's Harmonielehre:

Sound of nature 
The quotations above have shown the ambiguity of the word "klang", often taken to mean a "chord" but better understood as a complex or compound sound. The theory of the chord of nature does not resist examination because a chord by definition consists of several notes, each with its own overtone series. To view the overtones of a given fundamental note as a natural "model" to be imitated in art, as Schenker does, is not at all the same thing as viewing as model a chord built of several notes above the same root. The Klang, defined by Riemann as a compound sound (i.e. a note with its overtones), and the "chord of nature", defined by Schenker as a model needing "condensation" for the artistic usage are but abstract concepts.

See also 
Consonance and dissonance
Klangfarbenmelodie
Linear progression
Otonality and Utonality

Sources 

Chords
Harmonic series (music)
Riemannian theory
Schenkerian analysis